Edina is a city in Hennepin County, Minnesota, United States and a first-ring suburb of Minneapolis. The population was 53,494 at the 2020 census, making it the 18th most populous city in Minnesota.

Edina began as a small farming and milling community along Minnehaha Creek in the 1860s and became one of Minneapolis's first incorporated suburbs in 1888. After years of being a streetcar suburb, Edina saw expanded development as a car-centric suburb in the 1950s and 1960s.

Several major corporations, including Dairy Queen, Great Clips, Edina Realty, and Caribou Coffee, have headquarters in Edina, and the city today is known for its shopping, parks, and high quality of life. Edina also plays host to the nation's oldest indoor mall, the Southdale Center.

History

Settlement
Edina began as part of Richfield Township, Minnesota. By the 1870s, 17 families, most of them immigrating as a result of the Great Famine of Ireland, had come to Minnesota and claimed land in the southwest section of what was then Richfield Township. They were followed by settlers from New England and Germany, who claimed additional land near Minnehaha Creek. The Baird and Grimes neighborhoods (which are both listed on the National Register of Historic Places) and the Country Club District (then known as Waterville Mills) in the northeast part of Edina were among the first areas to be established. The area then known as the Cahill Settlement, at West 70th Street and Cahill Road, was also an early community center and the home of Cahill School.

In 1888, the residents of the township held a meeting to consider founding a new village, thus separating themselves from Richfield Township. The idea was favorably accepted by those within the community and a committee was established to oversee the transition.

Naming 
After the decision was made to form a new village, a debate ensued regarding the naming of the new village. Several town meetings were held in the Minnehaha Grange Hall, during which the names Hennepin Park, Westfield and Edina were suggested. Minutes taken by Henry F. Brown, a farmer and future owner (1889) of the Edina Mill, are summarized as follows:

At the next meeting, the name Edina was finally chosen with a vote of 47 for and 42 against.

There has been a prevailing myth about the decision to name the new village Edina, which states that two opposing communities—the Irish Cahill community and the Scottish Mill community—fought about whether to give the community an Irish name (Killarney Lakes) or a Scottish name (Edina). The 1860 census, however, indicates that there were no Scottish people in Edina in 1860, and only a couple were present at the time of Edina's founding (1888). 

Morningside

The first suburban development in Edina occurred during the early 1900s in Morningside, a neighborhood in the northeastern part of the village. As Morningside grew, conflict arose between its residents who wanted more city services, and the residents of the rest of the village who wanted to maintain Edina's rural character. As a result of that conflict, Morningside seceded from Edina in 1920 and became a separate village. In 1966, however, the Village of Morningside once again became part of Edina.

Early settlement
Edina was not the first settlement in its location. According to historian Deborah Morse-Kahn, the Quaker village that existed where Edina would be built included African American families of Civil War veterans and freed slaves "became very involved in community life—especially as farmland owners, civic and cultural leaders." At the November 1898 general election, J. Frank Wheaton, a Republican African American, was elected to the Minnesota House of Representatives representing District 42, which included all of Edina. Wheaton beat his white Democratic opponent in every Minneapolis city ward and in every village within the legislative district, including Edina, even though the legislative district had only approximately 100 African American residents out of a total of 40,000 residents.

Early development
In the early 20th century suburban development brought discriminatory policies that led to nearly all of the African Americans who had been living in Edina to move away.

Historian James W. Loewen described the suburb as a sundown town. Researchers point in particular to Samuel Thorpe's development of the Country Club Historic District, which used deed restrictions as means to exclude non-whites, stating explicitly that:

 Other developments, like that built by N. P. Dodge Corporation just a mile away, followed suit in attempting to protect land values through racial policies. Though the Supreme Court ruled these kinds of discriminatory housing clauses unenforceable in its Shelley v. Kraemer decision of 1948, reports of discrimination persisted through the 1950s and 1960s. According to the Edina Historical Society's story about the first black family in Morningside (then a separate village) in 1960, attempts to keep them out included tactics like trying "to get [their] lot condemned for drainage." In response, then-mayor Ken Joyce wrote a note dismissing the drainage concern and challenging citizens "to live the Golden Rule". Shortly thereafter the village voted in favor of inclusion.

Jewish residents were also affected by exclusionary deed covenants. In the 1960s, some residents boasted that Edina had "Not one Negro and not one Jew."

Geography
Residential areas comprise the largest portion of the City, which is now more than 95 percent developed.

Within Edina are many different neighborhoods; Highlands, Indian Hills, Morningside, Country Club District, Cahill Village, Chapel Hill, South Harriet Park, Interlachen, Rolling Green, Presidents, Sunnyslope, White Oaks, Parkwood Knolls, Braemar Hills, Birchcrest, Dewey Hill and Hilldale.

Demographics

2020 census

Note: the US Census treats Hispanic/Latino as an ethnic category. This table excludes Latinos from the racial categories and assigns them to a separate category. Hispanics/Latinos can be of any race.

As of the census of 2010, there were 47,941 people, 20,672 households, and 12,918 families residing in the city. The racial makeup of the city was 88.1% White, 3.0% African American, 0.2% Native American, 6.1% Asian, 0.7% from other races, and 1.8% from two or more races. Hispanic or Latino of any race were 2.3% of the population.

There were 20,672 households, of which 29.4% had children under the age of 18 living with them, 53.7% were married couples living together, 6.4% had a female householder with no husband present, 2.3% had a male householder with no wife present, and 37.5% were non-families. 33.1% of all households were made up of individuals, and 18% had someone living alone who was 65 years of age or older. The average household size was 2.31 and the average family size was 2.98.

The median age in the city was 45.2 years. 24.2% of residents were under the age of 18; 4.5% were between the ages of 18 and 24; 21% were from 25 to 44; 29.6% were from 45 to 64; and 20.7% were 65 years of age or older. The gender makeup of the city was 46.6% male and 53.4% female.

According to 2012–2016 estimates, the median household income was $91,847 and per capita income was $65,245. The median value of owner-occupied housing units was $424,500.

Religion
 Edina hosts Venkateswara Temple, a Hindu Temple, for the over 40,000 Hindus residing in the Minneapolis-St Paul area.
 Christ Presbyterian Church is a congregation within ECO: A Covenant Order of Evangelical Presbyterians with 5,388 members in 2012. CPC was founded in 1956. During Roger Anderson's ministry, the church began to grow rapidly. CPC became the largest Presbyterian congregation in the upper Midwest, and one of the largest Presbyterian churches in the nation, with membership passing 1,700. The former senior pastor, John Crosby, led CPC to be a congregation of over 5,000. In 2006, the church celebrated the 50th anniversary. The church was a leader in the movement to establish ECO as a breakaway movement from the Presbyterian Church (USA).

Economy

Edina serves as headquarters for several large companies: Jerry's Foods, Lund Food Holdings, Edina Realty, Regis Corporation, Dairy Queen, and Orange Julius.

The town's most notable shopping centers are Southdale Center, Galleria Edina, and 50th & France, which is shared with Minneapolis.

According to the city's Comprehensive Annual Financial Report for the fiscal year ended December 31, 2015, the top ten largest employers in the city are: Fairview Southdale Hospital, Edina Public Schools, the City of Edina, BI Worldwide, Regis, Barr Engineering, Lund Food Holdings, International Dairy Queen Inc., SunOpta, Edina Realty, and FilmTec Corporation, respectively.

Sports
Due in part to its strong boys and girls ice hockey programs, Edina was named by ESPN in 2020 as the "center of the center" of the American ice hockey universe. Since 2016, Edina's Braemar Ice Rink has hosted Da Beauty League, a 4-on-4 ice hockey league with rosters made up of current NHL, AHL, ECHL, and college hockey players wishing to maintain their offseason playing shape.

In December 1979, the first bandy game in the USA was played at Lewis Park Bandy Rink in Edina. It was a friendly game between the Swedish junior national team and Swedish club team Brobergs IF.

Parks and recreation

Parks
The Edina Park and Recreation Department oversees 44 parks, which include amenities such as baseball, football and soccer fields; softball diamonds; basketball and tennis courts; outdoor skating rinks; playground equipment for young children; and picnic shelters. The Department also maintains eight miles (13 km) of scenic pathways for bicycling, walking, jogging, cross-country skiing and snowshoeing.

Besides overseeing the parks, the Edina Park & Recreation Department is also responsible for the operation of 10 arts, community, and recreation facilities within the city including Braemar Golf Course, Braemar Ice Rink, Centennial Lakes Park, and Edinborough Park.

Three Rivers Park District, Hennepin County's regional park board, operates the Nine Mile Creek Regional Trail through Edina.

Waterways
Two prominent Twin Cities waterways, Minnehaha Creek and Nine Mile Creek, make their way through Edina on their ways to the Mississippi and Minnesota Rivers respectively. Both are sites for major regional parks and trails.

Country clubs
There are two country clubs located in Edina, the Edina Country Club and the Interlachen Country Club.

Education

Public schools

Edina Public Schools is the public school district (ISD 273) that serves Edina. It enrolls approximately 8,500 K–12 students and is served by 1,139 teachers and support staff.

Edina has one high school, Edina High School. The area is served by two middle schools: (South View Middle School and Valley View Middle School) and six elementary schools (Concord, Creek Valley, Cornelia, Highlands, Countryside, and Normandale).

Private schools
There are three private schools in Edina: Our Lady of Grace Catholic School, Golden Years Montessori, and Avail Academy-Edina Campus.

Colleges
The Minnesota State University, Mankato satellite campus.

Infrastructure

Transportation
Many major highways run through or are close to Edina, making it readily accessible to those within the metropolitan area. Minnesota State Highways 62 and 100 divide the City into four sections. U.S. Route 169 and Minnesota State Highway 100 extend north and south. Interstate 494 and Minnesota State Highway 62 extend east and west.

Transit
Before streetcar service was abandoned in 1954, the Twin City Rapid Transit Company's Lake Minnetonka Line went through Edina paralleling 44th Street on dedicated right-of-way. After streetcar service was abandoned, the right-of-way was developed as single family housing.

Bus service
Metro Transit, the Twin Cities regional transit authority, operates daytime buses in Edina, primarily along France Avenue and through business parks along Interstate 494. Edina's Southdale Transit Center is one of the southwest Twin Cities primary transit hubs.

The E Line, an arterial BRT route, is currently planned to travel from the University of Minnesota through Downtown Minneapolis and Uptown to the Southdale Transit Center in Edina. It is expected to be operational by 2026.

Commuter rail
The Dan Patch Line and successor Minneapolis, Northfield and Southern Railway operated interurban service through Edina until 1942. Although in poor condition and rated for speeds less than 35 mph, the tracks are still used by freight trains. Under the Dan Patch Corridor proposal, commuter trains would operate between Minneapolis and Northfield with a station in Edina. A feasibility study was conducted in 2000 and found that ridership would be high but there would be a significant cost to upgrade the corridor for commuter trains. Due to this and strong opposition from residents living near the rail line, the proposal was put on hold until other commuter rail lines could be built. In 2002 a legislative gag order was placed on the project, which forbid the Metropolitan Council, MnDOT, and county rail authorities from discussing, studying, and building commuter rail on the Dan Patch Line. In 2017 the Edina City Council conducted a study on the pros and cons of passenger rail on the Dan Patch Line. The conclusion was to not pursue passenger rail at that time (as of 2018).

Notable people
The following is a list of notable people who were either born in, lived in, are current residents of, or are otherwise closely associated with the city of Edina:

 David W. Anderson – founder of Famous Dave's restaurant chain
 Lynsey Bartilson – actress
 Kieffer Bellows – NHL player for the Philadelphia Flyers
 Dorothy Benham – Miss America, 1977
 Paris Bennett – American Idol contestant
 David Bloom – NBC television journalist
 Terri Bonoff – former member of the Minnesota Senate
 Ward Brehm – chairman and founder, The Brehm Group, Inc.
 Bud Brisbois – professional trumpet player
 Paige Bueckers - High school basketball phenom, ranked #1 for girls' basketball in the class of 2020 
 Corinne Buie - professional ice hockey player for the Minnesota Whitecaps
 Lois McMaster Bujold – fantasy and science fiction author
 Brian Burke – NHL hockey executive
 Austen S. Cargill II – member of the Cargill family
 Curt Carlson – founder of Carlson Companies
 Leeann Chin – founder of Leeann Chin Chinese Cuisine
 Ike Davis – baseball player for the Oakland Athletics
 John Denver – singer/activist 
 R. A. Dickey – baseball player and Cy Young Award winner
 Julia Duffy – actress known for Newhart
 Fredrik Eklund – real estate broker known for Million Dollar Listing New York
 Joe Finley – professional ice hockey player with the Buffalo Sabres
 Craig Finn – lead singer / rhythm guitarist for The Hold Steady
 Mardy Fish – professional tennis player
 Ric Flair – professional wrestler
 P. J. Fleck – Head coach, Minnesota Golden Gophers Football
 Tim Foecke - Metallurgist
 Stan Freese – American tuba player and musical director 
 Emily Fridlund – author of History of Wolves
 Adam Goldberg – NFL tackle/guard
 Judith Guest – novelist and screenwriter
 John Harris – amateur and professional golfer
 Doron Jensen – founder of Timber Lodge Steakhouse
 Richard A. Jensen – theologian and academic at Lutheran School of Theology at Chicago
 Ron Johnson – former CEO of J.C. Penney
 Ben Leber – NFL sports radio personality and former linebacker for the Minnesota Vikings
 Anders Lee – NHL center for the New York Islanders
 Bobby Lee – American actor and comedian
 Nicholas Legeros – bronze sculptor
 Hilary Lunke – professional golfer
 Jamie McBain – NHL defenseman for the Carolina Hurricanes
 Karl Mecklenburg – professional football player with the Denver Broncos
 Bus Mertes – former professional football player and coach for the Minnesota Vikings
 George Mikan – former professional basketball player for the Minneapolis Lakers
 Casey Mittelstadt – NHL center for the Buffalo Sabres
 Paul C. Nagel - college administrator, professor of history and biographer of the Adams and Lee political families
 Lou Nanne –  former NHL defenseman and general manager
 Win Neuger – former CEO, chairman, and Director at AIG
 Bill Nyrop – former NHL player with the Montreal Canadiens
 Donald Nyrop – former president and CEO of Northwest Airlines
 Greg Olson – former professional baseball player
 Mary Pawlenty – attorney, First District Judge
 Barbara Peterson – Miss Minnesota USA 1976, Miss USA 1976
 Paul Peterson – musician and producer, The Family and The Time
 Zach Parise – American professional ice hockey player
 Tom Petters – of Petters Group Worldwide
 Carl Pohlad – former owner, Minnesota Twins
 Jenny Potter – ice hockey player, Olympic gold medalist
 Kirby Puckett – former center fielder for the Minnesota Twins
 Paul Ranheim – former NHL forward
 Kaylin Richardson – World Cup Alpine Skier, Olympian
 Doug Risebrough – former General Manager, Minnesota Wild
 Laura Rizzotto – singer, songwriter
 Richard M. Schulze – founder and former chairman of Best Buy
 Joe Senser –  former NFL player for the Minnesota Vikings
 Jennifer Steinkamp – artist
 Don Storm – Minnesota state senator
 Christopher Straub – fashion designer and contestant on Project Runway 6
 Michele Tafoya – sportscaster
 Robert Ulrich – former chairman and CEO of Target Corporation
 Paul Westerberg – musician, frontman for The Replacements
 Jeff Wright – safety for the Minnesota Vikings[
 Andrew Zimmern – chef, host of Bizarre Foods and Bizarre World
 Jason Zucker – left wing for the Pittsburgh Penguins

Riddick Moss - Professional wrestler, currently signed to WWE

In popular culture

 The interior of a 1950s rambler in Edina's Highlands neighborhood was used in the Coen brothers' 2009 film A Serious Man.
 Lead singer Craig Finn from the band The Hold Steady is from Edina and has made several allusions to the town in their songs. For example, the song "Hornets! Hornets!" from the album Separation Sunday describes a wild night in the town, ending with the line "I drove the wrong way down 169 and almost died up by Edina High". Also, the song's title is a reference to Edina High School's mascot, the Hornet.
 In the movie D2: The Mighty Ducks, star forward Adam Banks, when asked his name and where he is from, introduces himself as "Adam Banks Edina, Minnesota".
 In the movie Jingle All the Way, some of the exterior house scenes were shot in Edina's Brucewood neighborhood, near Arden Park.
 Part of the 1994 movie Little Big League was shot at one of Countryside Park's baseball diamonds. The umpire wears an Edina Athletic Association T-shirt.

References

External links

 City website
 Edina Chamber of Commerce

 
Populated places established in 1888
Cities in Hennepin County, Minnesota
Cities in Minnesota
Sundown towns in the United States